Imam Muhammad Ashafa is co-director with Pastor James Wuye of the Interfaith Mediation Center of the Muslim-Christian Dialogue in Kaduna, Kaduna State, Northern Nigeria.

Biography 

As the eldest son of a Muslim scholar and spiritual leader of the Tijaniyya Sufi order from a long line of Imams, Muhammad Ashafa grew up in a conservative environment, eventually following the family vocation and becoming an Imam himself. But unlike his elders, he belongs to a generation influenced by the 1979 Islamic Revolution of Iran, the Saudi Salafi preachers and the Egyptian Muslim Brotherhood, which brought him to join an Islamist group determined to islamize northern Nigeria and drive out non-Muslims. This movement reached its peak during the 80's and 90's.

Muhammad Ashafa went on to become Secretary General of the National Council of Muslim Youth Organizations, an organization promoting debate and confrontation against Christians.
During a confrontation between Christians and Muslims in Zongon Kataf, Muhammad Ashafa lost two cousins and his spiritual mentor, while Secretary General of the Kaduna State chapter for the Youth Christian Association of Nigeria (YCAN) Pastor James Wuye lost his right arm. In 1995, the two former opponents decided to work together and build bridges between their respective communities and founded Interfaith Mediation Center of the Muslim-Christian Dialogue. The organization provide interfaith training to young people in schools and universities, to women, religious leaders and politicians. The center has thus contributed to defusing tensions in the 2002 and 2004 clashes in Kaduna and Yelwa.

Documentary Films
Imam Ashafa and Pastor Wuye have been the subject of two documentary films:
 The Imam and the Pastor (2006)
 An African Answer (2010)

Honors
Imam Muhammad Ashafa and Pastor James Wuye have received the Breme Peace Award in 2005, the Prize for Conflict Prevention awarded by the Fondation Chirac in 2009 and the Deutsche Afrika-Preis awarded by the German Africa Foundation in 2013.

They were among five recipients of this year’s prestigious 2017 ‘Intercultural Innovation Award’, conferred by the United Nations Alliance of Civilizations and BMW, for their successful mediations in conflicts in Nigeria. The award ceremony took place at UN Headquarters in New York on 29 November.

References

External links
 A Discussion with Pastor James Wuye and Imam Muhammad Ashafa, Berkley Center at Georgetown University, Oct. 2011.
 An African Answer: Pastor James Wuye and Imam Muhammad Ashafa, BBC, Nov. 2010.

Nigerian Muslims
Living people
Christian and Islamic interfaith dialogue
Year of birth missing (living people)